Karol Biermann is a Slovak professional ice hockey player who played with HC Slovan Bratislava in the Slovak Extraliga.

References

1984 births
Living people
HC Slovan Bratislava players
Slovak ice hockey forwards
Ice hockey people from Bratislava